Sigi Renz (born 2 August 1938) is a former German racing cyclist. He won the German National Road Race in 1963.

References

External links

1938 births
Living people
German male cyclists
Cyclists from Munich
German cycling road race champions
20th-century German people